Falkensee is a town in the Havelland district, Brandenburg, Germany. It is the most populated municipality of its district and it is situated at the western border of Berlin.

History
The commune Falkensee was formed in 1923 by the merger of Falkenhagen and Seegefeld, composing the common name from Falkenhagen and Seegefeld.

During World War II, the Demag-Panzerwerke subcamp of the Sachsenhausen concentration camp was located here. At its height, 2,500 people were imprisoned in the camp and used as slave labour. In November, 1945, the city issued 6 postage stamps of its own depicting a dove of peace. 

The municipality shared its borders with the former West Berlin, and so during the period 1961-1990 it was separated from it by the Berlin Wall.

Demography 
As a suburban municipality directly neighbouring Berlin, Falkensee grew strongly with Berlin itself. After World War II, Falkensee's population shrunk due to the relatively isolated position "behind" West Berlin, seen from the GDR capital. Since the fall of the Berlin Wall, Falkensee's population doubled and continues to grow.

Detailed data sources are to be found in the Wikimedia Commons.

Mayors
 May 1990-October 2007: Jürgen Bigalke (SPD)
 since November 2007: Heiko Müller (SPD)
Heiko Müller was reelected in October 2015 with 51,3 % of the votes.

Transport infrastructure
Falkensee has a railway station on the Berlin-Hamburg railway. Local trains and Regional Express trains stop here at the two outer platforms, both located on siding tracks, so that long-distance trains linking Hamburg and Berlin can bypass on the two middle tracks. Two local stopping trains linking Nauen with Berlin call at Falkensee, one going via the Northern Ringbahn (circular railway) to the tunnel level of  Berlin Hauptbahnhof, the other taking the Berlin Stadtbahn cross-city railway, terminating currently (in 1914) at the Berlin Schönefeld Airport

The northern side of the Falkensee railway station is the location of the central hub of the Falkensee bus network, and provides a covered stand for hundreds of bicycles.

Before the previous war, Falkensee was a stop on the suburban line from Nauen via Jungfernheide to the Berlin Lehrter Bahnhof station, the Berlin terminus of the Berlin-Hamburg railway. From August 1951 to the end of the 1950s, the Falkensee - Spandau and Spandau - Jungfernheide tracks were electrified with the Third Rail of the Berlin S-Bahn, allowing direct rail service from East Berlin to Falkensee, which was part of the GDR then. This link was severed by the Berlin Wall in 1961. From then on, until the reconstruction of the Berlin railway network in 1990, Falkensee could be reached from East Berlin only by the long detour via the Berlin outer ring.

Notable people 
 Louis Adlon (1874–1945), hotelier

 Hannjo Hasse (1921–1983), DEFA actor
 Carlos Rasch (born 1932), science fiction author
 Klaus Bednarz (1942–2015), journalist
 Ingo Voge (born 1958), bobsledder
 Katarina Witt (born 1965), German actress and retired figure skater
 Lisa Wender (born 1993)

References

External links

 

Localities in Havelland